A Tale from the Past is a 1987 Albanian historic comedy film directed by Dhimitër Anagnosti. Based on the book A Bridegroom at Fourteen by Andon Zako Çajupi.

Cast
Elvira Diamanti as Marigo
Admir Sorra as Gjino
Robert Ndrenika as Vangjel
Hajrie Rondo as Tana
Xhevdet Ferri	as Trim
Mimika Luca as Marigo's Mother
Xhemil Tagani as The Priest
Mira Minga as Kotja
Mehdi Malkaj as Milua

References

External links
 

1987 films
1987 comedy-drama films
Albanian-language films
Albanian comedy-drama films